Appu Nedungadi (11 October 1863  6 November 1933) is the author of Kundalatha, which was published in 1887, making it as the first novel published in Malayalam. He was associated with several literary publications including Kerala Pathrika, Kerala Sanchari and Vidya Vinodini. In 1899, he established Nedungadi Bank, the oldest private sector commercial bank in Kozhikode, Kerala. The bank was incorporated in 1913 and later in 2003, was taken over by the Punjab National Bank.

References

Malayalam novelists
19th-century Indian novelists
Novelists from Kerala
Businesspeople from Kozhikode
20th-century Indian businesspeople
Indian bankers
Indian male novelists
Indian company founders
1863 births
1933 deaths